Brent Burns (born March 9, 1985) is a Canadian professional ice hockey defenceman for the Carolina Hurricanes of the National Hockey League (NHL). Drafted as a right wing (20th overall) at the 2003 NHL Entry Draft by the Minnesota Wild, he was converted into a defenceman upon turning professional. Burns is known as a dynamic offensive player, and though he mostly plays defence, he has been utilized as a forward on several occasions during his career.

During the shortened 2012–13 season and continuing through the 2013–14 season, the Sharks used Burns as a forward. Starting with the 2014–15 season, he was returned to defence. At the end of the 2015–16 season, Burns finished third in voting for the James Norris Memorial Trophy (awarded to the NHL's best defenceman); one year later, at the end of the 2016–17 season, Burns won the award for the first time in his career.

Playing career

Amateur
Burns was drafted by the Minnesota Wild in the first round, 20th overall, in the 2003 NHL Entry Draft. He spent most of his minor hockey career playing for the Barrie Icemen and Ajax Knights of the Ontario Minor Hockey Association (OMHA). He spent two years playing in the Metropolitan Toronto Hockey league (MTHL), now called the Greater Toronto Hockey League (GTHL), for the North York Canadiens, along with fellow NHL draftees Anthony Stewart and Geoff Platt. Burns then played his Ontario Hockey League (OHL) career as a right winger with the Brampton Battalion in the 2002–03 season. He led the team in playoff scoring that season with five goals and six assists in 11 games. Burns was runner-up for Most Improved Player in the OHL as voted on by Leagues coaches.

Professional

Minnesota Wild (2003–2011)
Upon turning professional with the Wild in 2003, Burns was converted to defence by defensively-minded Minnesota Head Coach Jacques Lemaire. He made his NHL debut with the Wild on October 8, 2003, against the Chicago Blackhawks, and scored his first NHL goal in his third game, against the Sharks. Burns played in 36 games with Minnesota in the 2003–04 season, showing flashes of natural ability in rushing from the blueline. After spending the 2004–05 NHL lock-out in the American Hockey League (AHL) with the Houston Aeros, Burns adapted as a defenceman and earned a regular spot on the Wild roster for the 2005–06 season, contributing 16 points in 72 games.

In the 2006–07 season, Burns eclipsed his previous season's points total with 25 and became a significant force for the Wild in the latter months of the season, scoring back-to-back overtime winners in March and engaging in two fights during the 2007 Stanley Cup playoffs.

On October 25, 2007, during the 2007–08 season, Burns signed a four-year contract extension with the Wild. He emerged as one of the Wild's top defencemen, scoring a career-high 15 goals and 43 points.

In the 2008–09 season, Burns was regularly shifted between forward and defence with mild success before he was eventually hampered by a concussion that caused him to miss the final 19 games of the regular season. Burns' concussion was later a point of scrutiny when his agent, Ron Salcer, stipulated that Wild staff had misdiagnosed his symptoms for six weeks with sinusitis, putting Burns at an increased health risk. Burns then had shoulder surgery upon the completion of the Wild season. He finished the injury-marred season with 27 points.

Burns suffered another concussion briefly into his 2009–10 season, beginning to skate again only on January 14. He finished another injury-filled season with 20 points in 47 games. On November 12, 2010, Burns was suspended for two games for hitting Florida Panthers forward Steve Bernier. Burns hit Bernier on the chin with the knob of the stick, causing Bernier to bleed profusely.

San Jose Sharks (2011–2022)
During the 2011 NHL Entry Draft, Burns, along with a second-round draft pick in 2012, was traded to the San Jose Sharks in exchange for Devin Setoguchi, Charlie Coyle and a first-round pick in 2011. With a year still left in his contract with the Wild, Burns signed a five-year contract extension on August 1, 2011, with the Sharks; the deal would pay him $28.8 million over five years, with an average salary cap figure of $5.76 million. In 2013, after rookie defenceman Matt Irwin's acquisition by the Sharks, in March, Burns was moved to forward, where he scored 20 points in 23 regular season games. In the 2013–14 season, Burns played the first eight games of the season, but missed 13 games after October 21 due to sore gums. On November 21, Burns returned to the Sharks' line-up and scored a goal against the Tampa Bay Lightning in a 5–1 winning effort. On November 29, against the St. Louis Blues, Burns recorded his first career hat-trick in a 6–3 victory.

In August 2014, the Sharks announced that Burns would move back to defence where he scored 17 goals and finished tied for second among NHL defencemen with 60 points. Burns also won the NHL Foundation Player Award for outstanding charitable and community work.

He had a breakout season in 2015–16, finishing with 75 points (27 goals, 48 assists), then had 24 points (seven goals, 17 assists) in 24 Stanley Cup Playoff games to help the Sharks reach the Final for the first time since entering the NHL in 1991.

On November 22, 2016, Burns signed an eight-year $64 million contract extension with the Sharks through 2024–25, with an average annual value of $8 million per year.

In 2017, Burns won the James Norris Memorial Trophy as the league's best defenceman. He was also nominated for the Ted Lindsay Award, awarded annually to the league's best player as voted by the National Hockey League Players Association.

He played in his 1,000th career game on December 27, 2018, in a 4–2 win over the Anaheim Ducks.

Carolina Hurricanes (2022–present)
On July 13, 2022, the Sharks traded Burns and Lane Pederson to the Carolina Hurricanes in exchange for forward Steven Lorentz, goaltending prospect Eetu Mäkiniemi, and a third-round selection in the 2023 NHL Entry Draft. On January 29, 2023, Burns played his 1,300th NHL game.

International play

Burns was named the best defenceman at the 2008 World Championships as he helped Canada to a silver medal finish as the host country. Two years later, at the 2010 World Championships, Burns led all Canadian defencemen in ice time at 18:29 minutes per game as Canada finished in seventh place. He was also part of the summer camp roster for Canada in the 2010 Winter Olympics, though he did not make the final roster cut. At the 2015 World Championships Burns was again named the best defenceman, and a member of the all-star team, as part of Canada's gold medal-winning team.

Personal life
Burns and his wife, Susan Holder, married in July 2009 and have three kids.

Off the ice, Burns spends his summers in Barrie, Ontario, and Lake Elmo, Minnesota, and is a noted animal enthusiast. His suburban Saint Paul home is nicknamed "Burns Zoo" due to his collection of dogs, cats and dozens of reptiles, mainly snakes. Burns Zoo was subject of a CBC Hockey Night in Canada feature with Elliotte Friedman and on After Hours.

Starting in the 2009 season, Burns purchased a suite at the Xcel Energy Center for members of the military and their families to attend Minnesota Wild home games.

Burns also owns and operates a ranch in Texas where he raises and maintains many species of exotic animals, including Wildebeest, Fallow deer, and more. For his 1000th game, his fellow San Jose Sharks teammates bought him two antelopes to add to his animal collection.

Burns made his acting debut with a 2-episodes role in season 6 of Vikings as an ambitious raider named Skane.

Career statistics

Regular season and playoffs

International

Awards and honours

References

External links
 
 

1985 births
Living people
Brampton Battalion players
Canadian expatriate ice hockey players in the United States
Canadian ice hockey defencemen
Carolina Hurricanes players
Houston Aeros (1994–2013) players
Ice hockey people from Simcoe County
James Norris Memorial Trophy winners
Minnesota Wild draft picks
Minnesota Wild players
National Hockey League All-Stars
National Hockey League first-round draft picks
People from Lake Elmo, Minnesota
San Jose Sharks players
Sportspeople from Barrie